Garra typhlops, also known as the Iran cave barb is a species of ray-finned fish in the family Cyprinidae. It is endemic to caves in Iran. Like other cave-adapted fish, it is blind and lacks pigmentation.

Three other cave-adapted fish species are known from Iran: Garra lorestanensis, G. tashanensis and the Zagroz blind loach (Eidinemacheilus smithi). In the general region there are three additional cavefish species, all Iraqi cypriniforms: Eidinemacheilus proudlovei, Caecocypris basimi, Typhlogarra widdowsoni.

References

Garra
Cave fish
Cyprinid fish of Asia
Fish described in 1944
Taxa named by Anton Frederik Bruun
Taxonomy articles created by Polbot